A hurricane, also called a tropical cyclone, is a rapidly rotating storm system.

Hurricane may also refer to:

Film 
 Hurricane (1929 film), a film by Ralph Ince
 The Hurricane (1937 film), a film by John Ford
 Hurricane (1974 film), an American TV film by Jerry Jameson
 Hurricane (1979 film), a film starring Mia Farrow
 The Hurricane (1999 film), a film starring Denzel Washington
 Hurricane (2018 film), a 2018 film starring Iwan Rheon

Literature
 The Hurricane (novel) (1936), a novel by Charles Nordhoff and James Norman Hall
 Hurricane (comics), various unrelated Marvel Comics characters

Military 
 Hawker Hurricane, a British Second World War fighter aircraft
 Hurricane, nickname of the US Army's 48th Armored Division

Music

Groups 
 Hurricane (American band), American metal band
 Hurricane (Serbian band), Serbian girl group
 Hurricane #1, UK pop group
 The Hurricanes, British R&B band
 The Hurricanes, Australian band featuring Terry Britten

Albums 
 Hurricane (Eric Benét album) (2005)
 Hurricane (Nick Fradiani album) (2016)
 Hurricane (Natalie Grant album) (2013)
 Hurricane #1, a 1997 album by Hurricane #1
 Hurricane (Grace Jones album) (2008)
 Hurricane (Middle Class Rut album) (2011)
 Hurricane, a 1996 album by Agatha Christie

Songs 
 "Hurricane" (Athlete song) (2007)
 "Hurricane" (Lauren Bennett song) (2016)
 "Hurricane" (The Click song) (1995)
 "Hurricane" (Luke Combs song) (2016)
 "Hurricane" (Cradle to the Grave), a 1997 song recorded by Grace Jones
 "Hurricane" (Bob Dylan song) (1975)
 "Hurricane" (Leon Everette song) (1981)
 "Hurricane" (Natalie Grant song) (2013)
 "Hurricane" (Halsey song) (2014)
 "Hurricane" (Lead song) (2011)
 "Hurricane" (Lifehouse song) (2015)
 "Hurricane" (Bridgit Mendler song) (2012)
 "Hurricane" (Puffy AmiYumi song) (1981)
 "Hurricanes" (Pull Tiger Tail song) (2007)
 "Hurricane" (Rebound! song) (2010)
 "Hurricane" (Thirty Seconds to Mars song) (2011)
 "Hurricane" (Thrice song) (2017)
 "Hurricane" (Kanye West song), a song by Kanye West from Donda
 "Hurricane" (Westend song), the Austrian entry in the Eurovision Song Contest 1983
 "Hurricane", a song by B.A.P. from Badman EP
 "Hurricane", a song by Kim Carnes from Café Racers
 "Hurricane", a song by Cascada from Waterfall: The Essential Dance Remix Collection
 "Hurricane", a song by Collective Soul from See What You Started by Continuing
 "Hurricane", a song by Cover Drive from Bajan Style
 "Hurricane", a song by Ilse DeLange
 "Hurricanes", a song by Dido from Still on My Mind
 "Hurricane", a song by Faker from Addicted Romantic
 "Hurricane", a song by The Fray from Helios
 "Hurricane", a song by The Hush Sound from Goodbye Blues
 "Hurricane", a song by Natalie Imbruglia from White Lilies Island
 "Hurricane", a song by Infernal
 "Hurricane", a song by Kyuss from ...And the Circus Leaves Town
 "Hurricane", a song by MS MR
 "Hurricane", a song by Needtobreathe from The Outsiders
 "Hurricane", a song by Panic! at the Disco from Vices & Virtues
 "Hurricane", a song by Alyssa Reid from Time Bomb
 "Hurricane", a song by The Roots, Common and Mos Def from the soundtrack for the film The Hurricane
 "Hurricane", a song by Samestate
 "Hurricane (The Formal Weather Pattern)", a song by Something Corporate from Audioboxer
 "Hurricane", a song by Theory of a Deadman from The Truth Is...
 "Hurricane", a song by The Vamps from Alexander and the Terrible, Horrible, No Good, Very Bad Day
 "Hurricane", a song by Warm Jets from Future Signs
 "Hurricane", a song from the musical Hamilton

Places

Australia 
 Hurricane, Queensland, a locality in the Shire of Mareeba

United States

Inhabited places
 Hurricane, Alabama, an unincorporated community
 Hurricane, Kentucky, an unincorporated community
 Hurricane, Bollinger County, Missouri, an unincorporated community
 Hurricane, Washington County, Missouri, an unincorporated community
 Hurricane, North Carolina, an unincorporated community
 Hurricane, Utah, a city
 Hurricane, West Virginia, a city
 Hurricane, Wisconsin, an unincorporated community

Natural formations
 Hurricane Canal, an irrigation canal near Hurricane, Utah
 Hurricane Cliffs, in Utah and Arizona
 Hurricane Hill, Olympic National Park, Washington
 Hurricane Lake, a lake in Minnesota
 Hurricane Mesa, a landform near Hurricane, Utah
 Hurricane Pass, Grand Teton National Park, Wyoming
 Hurricane Plantation, near Vicksburg, Mississippi
 Hurricane Ridge, Olympic National Park, Washington

Rides
 Hurricane (ride), an amusement ride first manufactured by Frank Hrubrtz & Co
 Hurricane: Category 5, a demolished roller coaster at the former Myrtle Beach Pavilion
 Hurricane (Fun Spot America), a roller coaster located at Fun Spot America in Kissimmee, Florida

Schools 
 Hurricane High School (Utah)
 Hurricane High School (West Virginia)

Ships 
 Hurricane (clipper), a clipper ship built in New Jersey in 1851
 HMS Hurricane (H06), a Royal Navy destroyer built in 1940 
 USS Hurricane (PC-3), a US Navy patrol ship built in 1992

Sport

Canada 
 Guelph Hurricanes, a Canadian junior ice hockey team from Guelph, Ontario
 Lethbridge Hurricanes, a Canadian junior ice hockey team from Lethbridge, Alberta
 Newmarket Hurricanes, a Canadian junior ice hockey team from Newmarket, Ontario
 Toronto RCAF Hurricanes, a former rugby football team in Ontario
 Waterloo Hurricanes, a former junior ice hockey team based in Waterloo, Ontario,
 Westfort Hurricanes, a former Canadian Junior ice hockey club from Fort William, Ontario

Denmark 
 Hørsholm Hurricanes, a softball club based in Denmark

Germany
 Kiel Baltic Hurricanes, an American football team in Kiel, Germany
 Saarland Hurricanes, an American football team in Saarbrücken, Germany

Hungary
 Budapest Hurricanes, an American football team based in Budapest, Hungary

Jamaica
 Hurricanes Rugby League, a Jamaican rugby league team

Japan
 Hurricanes (X-League), an American football team in Kodaira, Tokyo, Japan

New Zealand
 Hurricanes (rugby union), a rugby union team in the Super Rugby competition based in Wellington, New Zealand

United Kingdom
 Midlands Hurricanes, a semi-professional rugby league team in Coventry, England
 Dundee Hurricanes, an American football team based in Dundee, Scotland
 Paisley Hurricanes, an amateur rugby league team in Paisley, Scotland

United States 
 Carolina Hurricanes, a National Hockey League team in Raleigh, North Carolina
 Harmarville Hurricanes, a former amateur soccer team in Harmarville, Pennsylvania
 Hartford Hurricanes, a 1940s American Basketball League team in Hartford, Connecticut
 Holyoke Hurricanes, a defunct Independent Women's Football League team, Holyoke, Massachusetts
 Honolulu Hurricanes, a former professional Indoor Football League team in Honolulu, Hawaii
 Houston Hurricane, a former North American Soccer League team in Houston, Texas
 Houston Hurricanes, a former United Soccer Leagues team in Houston, Texas
 Houston Hurricanes FC, an American soccer club based in Houston, Texas
 Miami Hurricanes, the athletic teams of the University of Miami, Florida
 Tulsa Golden Hurricane, the athletic teams of the University of Tulsa, Oklahoma

Television
 Hurricanes (TV series), a UK TV series about a fictional soccer team
 "Hurricane!" (American Dad!), a 2011 episode of American Dad!
 "Hurricane!" (Nova), a 1989 episode of Nova
 "The Hurricane!", a 2011 episode of The Cleveland Show
 Breaux Greer or Hurricane (born 1976), gladiator on American Gladiators
 Hurricane, a supervillain in the TV series Black Scorpion

Transportation 
 GWR Hurricane locomotive, a broad gauge locomotive of the Great Western Railway
 Hurricane, a GWR 3031 Class locomotive on the Great Western Railway between 1891 and 1915
 Jeep Hurricane, a 2005 concept vehicle
 RAE Hurricane, a light monoplane of the 1920s
 Willys Hurricane engine
 Honda Hurricane (disambiguation), a number of Honda motorcycles
 Hurricane, a Romney, Hythe and Dymchurch Railway locomotive
 Project Hurricane, Ford Boss engine

Other uses 
 Hurricane (painting), a 1944 painting by John Marin
 Hurricane (cocktail), an alcoholic drink
 Hurricane (nickname)
 Hurricane (pinball), a pinball game by Williams Electronics
 Hurricane Festival, a German rock music festival
 Hurricane lamp, a type of kerosene lantern
 The Hurricane and Rosey, a WWE professional wrestling tag team
 ACA Hurricane, a 1970s civil defense siren made by American Signal Corporation
 Gregory Helms or the Hurricane (born 1974), professional wrestler

People with the name
 Al Hurricane (1936–2017), American singer-songwriter
 Hurricane Ryu (born 1958), Japanese actor and manga artist
 Norman Smith (record producer) or Hurricane Smith (1923–2008), English recording engineer and producer
 DJ Hurricane (born 1965), American rapper and DJ
 Hurricane Chris (rapper) (born 1989), American rapper
 Hurricane G, American rapper
 Rubin "Hurricane" Carter, boxer who was imprisoned and later absolved

See also
 Hurricane Creek (disambiguation)
 Hurricane Mountain (disambiguation)
 
 Harry Kane (disambiguation)
 Hurriganes, a 1970s Finnish rock band
 Operation Hurricane (disambiguation)